From Death to the Stars is a collection of a fantasy novel and science fiction short stories by L. Ron Hubbard.  It was published in 1953 by Fantasy Publishing Company, Inc. in an edition of 300 copies.  The book is an omnibus edition of Hubbard's Death's Deputy and The Kingslayer.  Many of the stories had first appeared in the magazines Unknown and Astounding.

Contents
 "Death's Deputy"
 "The Kingslayer"
 "The Beast"
 "The Invaders"

References

1953 short story collections
Science fiction short story collections
Fantasy short story collections
Fantasy Publishing Company, Inc. books